Eloise Suzanne Drennan (born 28 October 1998) is an Australian pop singer-songwriter. She is the youngest winner of The Voice Australia, competing as a member of Team Jessie at the age of 16, in July–August 2015. She gained a large following from her YouTube covers.

Drennan listed her inspirations as Adele, Matt Corby, Katy Perry and Angus & Julia Stone. Her debut album Close Your Eyes was released on 11 September 2015 via Universal Music Australia, which reached No. 14 on the ARIA Albums Chart. Her winning track, "Ghost", became her debut single, which reached No. 25 on the ARIA Singles Chart. She followed this with "Hard Love", which peaked in the top 50. In 2019, Ellie returned to the music scene with her first independent release, a single titled 'Taxi' released digitally and announced plans to release an EP in 2020.

Early life
Drennan was born in 1998 in the Central Coast, New South Wales and went to St Josephs Catholic College, East Gosford.

Career

2015: The Voice
In 2015, Ellie Drennan, took part in season 4 of The Voice Australia, where she joined team Jessie J, after singing Take it All by Adele in the blind audition. She made it through the Grand Finale on 30 August, where she was announced winner. Her winner's single was Ghost.

 denotes winner.
 denotes a song that reached the top 10 on iTunes.

Discography

Studio albums

Extended plays

Singles

References

External links
 

1998 births
Living people
The Voice (Australian TV series) contestants
The Voice (franchise) winners
People from the Central Coast (New South Wales)
Drennan, Ellie
21st-century Australian singers
21st-century Australian women singers